Abba Musa Rimi CON (born 28 February 1940) is a Nigerian politician who was elected Deputy Governor of Kaduna State, Nigeria in October 1979 during the Nigerian Second Republic, becoming acting governor when the Governor Abdulkadir Balarabe Musa was impeached on 23 June 1981.
He was elected on the platform of the People's Redemption Party.

In February 1982 Pope John Paul II visited Kaduna. Although squabbling Muslim religious leaders failed to show up, while at the airport the Pope read an address to Rimi and other government officials urging cooperation and unity among Christians and Muslims before flying on to Lagos.
In August 1982 Rimi was forced to appeal to the Jama'atul Nasril Islam (JNI) to find a way to end violent clashes between the Izala and Darika Muslim groups.
Rimi officially opened IBBI Nigeria, now a leading brewery in Northern Nigeria, on 27 March 1982.

After General Muhammadu Buhari seized power in a coup on 31 December 1983, he arrested most of the former governors. On 28 March 1985, a Special Military Tribunal sentenced Rimi to 21 years in jail for corruptly enriching 96 legislators of the State House of Assembly by N500,000. Rimi said he had given the money to the legislator "for keeping the law and order in their constituencies".

Rimi worked in sales and marketing for various multinational companies such as UAC, NTC and G.B. OLLIVANT. He later became a director of African Circle Pollution Management.
He became a holder of Commander Order of the Niger (CON).
He is married to a wife and has seven children.

In October 1998 Rimi became the special advisor on political affairs to the military head of state Abdulsalam Abubakar during the transition to civilian rule with the Nigerian Fourth Republic.

References

Living people
1940 births
Nigerian Muslims
Governors of Kaduna State
People's Redemption Party politicians
Commanders of the Order of the Niger